Doug Baird (born 16 November 1950) is a former Australian rules footballer who played with Carlton in the Victorian Football League (VFL).

His son Cameron was an Australian soldier and posthumous recipient of the Victoria Cross for Australia.

Notes

External links 

Doug Baird's profile at Blueseum

1950 births
Carlton Football Club players
Cooee Football Club players
Australian rules footballers from Victoria (Australia)
Living people